Vladimir Radkevich (born 31 March 1976) is an Uzbekistani-Kyrgyzstani football coach and a former player of Russian roots. He is an assistant manager of Russian club FC Zenit Penza.

Club career
Radkevich previously played for FC Rotor Volgograd in Russian Premier League as well as FC Ural and FC SKA-Energia Khabarovsk in the Russian First Division.

International
He was a member of the Uzbekistan national football team.

Club career stats

References

External links

1976 births
Living people
Uzbekistani footballers
Association football defenders
Uzbekistani expatriate footballers
Uzbekistan international footballers
Kyrgyzstani footballers
Kyrgyzstan youth international footballers
FC Rotor Volgograd players
Kyrgyzstani people of Russian descent
FC Ural Yekaterinburg players
FK Neftchi Farg'ona players
People from Fergana
Expatriate footballers in Russia
Russian Premier League players
FC SKA-Khabarovsk players
Uzbekistani people of Russian descent
Uzbekistani expatriate sportspeople in Russia
Uzbekistani football managers
Uzbekistani expatriate football managers
Expatriate football managers in Russia